Acta Physica could refer to several scientific journal of physics:

Acta Physica Aedificiorum (also known as the Nordic Journal of Building Physics)
Acta Physica Austriaca
Acta Physica Debrecina
Acta Physica Hungarica
Acta Physica Polonica
Acta Physica Sinica
Acta Physica Slovaca
Acta Physica Universitatis Comenianae

See also
Helvetica Physica Acta